Kyra Fortuin (born 15 May 1997) is a field hockey player from the Netherlands, who plays as a forward.

Personal life
Kyra Fortuin was born and raised in Maastricht, Netherlands.

Career

Club hockey
In the Dutch Hoofdklasse, Fortuin plays club hockey for SCHC. 

Her club history includes representation for Oranje Zwart and HC Oranje-Rood.

National teams

Under–21
In 2016, Fortuin appeared for the Netherlands U–21 on two occasions. Her first appearance was during a Four–Nations Tournament in Bad Kreuznach, Germany, and the second at the Junior World Cup in Santiago, Chile. At the tournament, Fortuin scored two goals, and helped the team to a silver medal finish, losing in the final to Argentina.

The following year in 2017, Fortuin won her first gold medal with the team at the EuroHockey Junior Championship in Valencia, Spain.

Oranje Dames
In 2019, Fortuin made her debut for the Netherlands senior team during the inaugural tournament of the FIH Pro League.

References

External links
 
 

1997 births
Living people
Female field hockey forwards
Sportspeople from Utrecht (city)
SCHC players
Dutch female field hockey players
HC Oranje-Rood players
Oranje Zwart players
20th-century Dutch women
21st-century Dutch women